The Country Blues of John Lee Hooker (also known as The Folk Blues of John Lee Hooker) is the third studio album by blues musician John Lee Hooker recorded in Detroit in 1959 and released by the Riverside label.

Reception

The Penguin Guide to Blues Recordings said "Riverside required Hooker to play only acoustic guitar. What motivated this redirection, and in particular the 'classic blues' repertoire on the first album was a view of the blues - you might say a politics of the blues - very much of its time... though, as always with Hooker the result is not exact commemoration so much as highly personalised allusion".

AllMusic reviewer Richie Unterberger stated: "John Lee Hooker was still churning out R&B-influenced electric blues with a rhythm section for Vee Jay when he recorded The Country Blues of John Lee Hooker, his first album packaged for the folk/traditional blues market. He plays nothing but acoustic guitar, and seems to have selected a repertoire with old-school country-blues in mind. It's unimpressive only within the context of Hooker's body of work; in comparison with other solo outings, the guitar sounds thin, and the approach restrained".

Track listing
All compositions credited to John Lee Hooker except where noted
 "Black Snake" (Blind Lemon Jefferson) – 3:33
 "How Long Blues" (Leroy Carr) – 2:14
 "Wobblin' Baby" – 2:51
 "She's Long, She's Tall, She Weeps Like a Willow" – 2:47
 "Pea Vine Special" (Charlie Patton) – 3:10
 "Tupelo Blues" – 3:23
 "I'm Prison Bound" (Carr) – 3:58
 "I Rowed a Little Boat" – 3:28
 "Water Boy" – 3:00
 "Church Bell Tone" – 3:43
 "Bundle Up and Go" – 2:13
 "Good Morning Lil' School Girl" (Sonny Boy Williamson I) – 3:38
 "Behind the Plow" – 4:22

Personnel
John Lee Hooker – guitar, vocals

References

John Lee Hooker albums
1959 albums
Riverside Records albums